Përparim Dervishi (born 29 August 1955) served as Albania's Director General of Customs from 2005–2009. In 1993 he was named as the first director of the National Privatisation Agency. Four years later Mr. Dervishi would be appointed as the Ambassador of the Republic of Albania to Hungary. His career profession is teaching. He began teaching economics and business management in 1983 as a professor at Tirana University. Since 2009 Mr.Dervishi is involved as a full-time lecturer at the University of New York Tirana and is Head of the Business Administration Department.

References

Ambassadors of Albania to Hungary
Diplomats from Kavajë
Living people
1955 births